Events from the year 2004 in Sweden

Incumbents
 Monarch – Carl XVI Gustaf
 Prime Minister – Göran Persson

Events

Full date unknown
NodeOne, a commercial open-source software company is founded.

Deaths

 9 January – Börje Dorch, journalist (born 1929).
 15 August – Sune Bergström, biochemist (born 1916).
 9 November – Stieg Larsson, journalist and novelist (born 1954).
 17 November – Mikael Ljungberg, wrestler (born 1970).

See also
 2004 in Swedish television

References

 
Years of the 21st century in Sweden
Sweden